Giovanni Bianchi may refer to:

 Giovanni Bianchi (physician) (1693–1775), Italian  physician, anatomist, archaeologist, zoologist and intellectual
 Giovanni Bianchi (politician) (1939–2017), Italian politician and teacher